This article presents a list of the historical events and publications of Australian literature during 1967.

Major publications

Books 

 A. Bertram Chandler – Nebula Alert
 Jon Cleary – The Long Pursuit
 Kenneth Cook – Tuna
 Dymphna Cusack – The Sun is Not Enough
 Catherine Gaskin –  Edge of Glass
 Thomas Keneally – Bring Larks and Heroes
 Eric Lambert – Hiroshima Reef
 Joan Lindsay – Picnic at Hanging Rock
 Tony Morphett – Dynasty
 Barry Oakley – A Wild Ass of a Man
 Katharine Susannah Prichard – Subtle Flame
 Kylie Tennant – Tell Morning This
 George Turner – The Lame Dog Man

Short stories 

 Beatrice Davis – Short Stories of Australia - The Moderns (edited)
 Frank Hardy – Billy Borker Yarns Again
 Shirley Hazzard – People in Glass Houses
 Douglas Stewart – Short Stories of Australia - The Lawson Tradition (edited)
 Kylie Tennant – Ma Jones and the Little White Cannibals
 Jack Wodhams – "There is a Crooked Man"

Children's and Young Adult fiction 

 Hesba Brinsmead – A Sapphire for September
 Nan Chauncy – Mathinna's People
 Mavis Thorpe Clark – Blue Above the Trees
 Eleanor Spence – The Sitherby Pilgrims
 Ivan Southall
 The Fox Hole
 To the Wild Sky
 Randolph Stow – Midnite : The Story of a Wild Colonial Boy

Poetry 

 Bruce Dawe – "Life-Cycle"
 Geoffrey Dutton – Poems Soft and Loud
 Rodney Hall – Eyewitness : Poems
 Gwen Harwood – "In Brisbane"
 Dorothy Hewett – The Hidden Journey
 Les Murray – "An Absolutely Ordinary Rainbow"
 David Rowbotham – Bungalow and Hurricane : new poems
 Thomas Shapcott – A Taste of Salt Water : Poems
 Douglas Stewart – Collected Poems 1936-1967
 Chris Wallace-Crabbe – The Rebel General

Plays 

 Dorothy Hewett - This Old Man Comes Rolling Home

Biography 

 Donald Horne – The Education of Young Donald
 Lionel Lindsay – Comedy of Life : An Autobiography
 Robert Menzies – Afternoon Light : Some Memories of Men and Events
 Bill Scott – Focus on Judith Wright

Awards and honours

Literary

Children and Young Adult

Poetry

Births 

A list, ordered by date of birth (and, if the date is either unspecified or repeated, ordered alphabetically by surname) of births in 1967 of Australian literary figures, authors of written works or literature-related individuals follows, including year of death.

 15 May – James Bradley, novelist
 23 May – Sean Williams, novelist

Unknown date

 Nikki Gemmell, novelist
 Melissa Lucashenko, novelist

Deaths 

A list, ordered by date of death (and, if the date is either unspecified or repeated, ordered alphabetically by surname) of deaths in 1967 of Australian literary figures, authors of written works or literature-related individuals follows, including year of birth.

 21 January – Cecil Mann, journalist, poet and novelist (born 1896)
 7 February – David Unaipon, writer (born 1872)
 29 March – D'Arcy Niland, novelist (born 1917)
10 September – Vera Dwyer, novelist (born 1889)
 25 November– Hal Gye, artist and writer (born 1887)

Unknown date
 Llewelyn Lucas, poet (born 1898)

See also 
 1967 in Australia
1967 in literature
 1967 in poetry
 List of years in Australian literature
List of years in literature

References

 
Australian literature by year
20th-century Australian literature
1967 in literature